An oyster schooner is a type of traditional fishing boat specifically designed for the harvesting of oysters.  Typically, an oyster schooner was a gaff-rigged two-masted schooner akin to the Dorchester schooner.  They were used in the past in Delaware Bay until a blight killed most of the oysters in that area.  A surviving example is the A.J. Meerwald located in Bivalve, New Jersey.

See also 
 A. J. Meerwald
 Cashier
 Katherine M. Lee
 Maggie S. Myers

References

External links
A. J. Meerwald History & Specifications

Types of fishing vessels
+Oyster
Schooner